Silvia Rovira (born 15 December 1967) is a Spanish cyclist. She competed at the 1996 Summer Olympics and the 2000 Summer Olympics.

References

External links
 

1967 births
Living people
Spanish female cyclists
Olympic cyclists of Spain
Cyclists at the 1996 Summer Olympics
Cyclists at the 2000 Summer Olympics
Cyclists from Barcelona
20th-century Spanish women